Combined Artistic Productions is a South African production company owned by Jon Sparkes, George Mazarakis, and Nomahlubi Simamane, a Black Economic Empowerment partner.

The company produces South Africa's longest-running television series, Carte Blanche, for M-Net. The series started in 1988. In January 2010 two spin-off series were launched, namely, Carte Blanche Consumer and Carte Blanche Medical. In 2011, a further spin-off, Carte Blanche Extra was launched, which departed from the magazine format for a more behind-the-scenes reality format.

On 8 September 2009 FIFA selected Combined Artistic Productions to produce the FIFA World Cup Final Draw in Cape Town, which was broadcast to an expected 200-million viewers. The company also produced the Preliminary Draw in Durban in November 2007 and the FIFA Confederations Cup draw in Johannesburg in November 2008.

References

External links
Combined Artistic Productions
2010 FIFA World Cup South Africa: Final Draw

Television production companies of South Africa